Kar or KAR may refer to: 

 .kar, a file format for karaoke files
 Kar, Iran, in Kurdistan Province
 Kar (beetle), a genus of beetles
 Car (Greek myth)
 Kar (novel), 2002, by Orhan Pamuk
 Kar (political group), a former faction in Afghanistan
 Kar (Turkish music), a genre in Ottoman classical music
 Kainic acid receptor, ion channels that respond to neurotransmitters
 Karair, a Finnish airline, by ICAO code
 Killer activation receptor
 King's African Rifles, British regiment, 1902-1960s
 ISO 639-5 code for Karenic languages

See also
 Car (disambiguation)
 Khar (disambiguation)